Canhotinho (Little Left-handed) is a city located in the state of Pernambuco, Brazil. Located  at 223 km away from Recife, capital of the state of Pernambuco. Has an estimated (IBGE 2020) population of 24,773 inhabitants.

Geography
 State - Pernambuco
 Region - Agreste Pernambucano
 Boundaries - Lajedo and Jurema   (N);  Palmeirina    (S);  Quipapá and Alagoas state  (E);   Angelim and Calçado    (W).
 Area - 423.08 km2
 Elevation - 520 m
 Hydrography - Mundaú and Una rivers
 Vegetation - Subperenifólia forest
 Climate - Hot and humid
 Annual average temperature - 21.7 c
 Distance to Recife - 223 km

Economy
The main economic activities in Canhotinho are based in commerce and agribusiness, especially sugarcane, beans, manioc; and livestock such as cattle, sheep and poultry.

Economic indicators

Economy by Sector
2006

Health indicators

References

Municipalities in Pernambuco